Alaşa (also, Alasha and Alashakend) is a village and municipality in the Astara Rayon of Azerbaijan.  It has a population of 396.

References 

Populated places in Astara District